Gallio may refer to:

People
 Lucius Junius Gallio Annaeanus (1–65), Roman governor of Achaea
 Stefano Gallio (born 1908), Italian footballer
 Tolomeo Gallio (1527–1607), Italian Cardinal

Other uses
 Gallio, Veneto, town in Vicenza, Veneto, Italy
 Gallio (skipper), genus of skipper butterflies in the family Hesperiidae

See also 

 Gallia (disambiguation)
 Galio (disambiguation)